Gap Mills is an unincorporated community in Monroe County, West Virginia,  United States. Established in 1775 and located on West Virginia Route 3 east of Union, Gap Mills has a post office with ZIP code 24941.

Fort Henry commander Abraham Wood sent the first recorded English expedition to reach the area in 1671.

The name of the community is a portmanteau of the natural pass, or "gap" in the adjacent Gap Mountain and two grist mills that were once located there.

References

Unincorporated communities in Monroe County, West Virginia

Unincorporated communities in West Virginia